The women's keirin at the 2011 Dutch National Track Championships in Apeldoorn took place at Omnisport Apeldoorn on December 29, 2011.  13 athletes participated in the contest.

Willy Kanis won the gold medal, Yvonne Hijgenaar took silver and Shanne Braspennincx won the bronze.

Competition format
The Keirin races involved 5.5 laps of the track behind a motorcycle, followed by a 2.5 lap sprint to the finish. The tournament consisted of a semi-finals round, repechages and the finals. The top two cyclists in each semi-final advanced to the final, with the rest of the cyclists competing again in the repechage. Two of those cyclists advanced from the two repechage to the final as well, for a total of 6 finalists. The other riders competed in the 7th to 13th place classification race.

Results

Semi-finals

Semi-final 1

Semi-final 2

Repaches

Heat 1

Heat 2

Finals
7th - 13th

Gold medal match

Final results

Results from uci.ch and nkbaanwielrennen.nl.

References

2011 Dutch National track cycling championships
Dutch National Track Championships – Women's keirin
Dutch